First Dates is an American reality television show based on the British version of the show of the same name. It first aired on the NBC network on April 7, 2017. Ellen DeGeneres was the executive producer and Drew Barrymore narrated. It was not picked up for a second season.

Format
The show was filmed at the MK Restaurant in near North Side Chicago, showing many people on blind dates—i.e., they haven't met each other before. At the end of the date, the couples were interviewed together and asked whether they would like to see each other again.

Since transmission of the first season's final episode, the MK Restaurant has closed, due to a dispute between the building's new landlord and the owner. Its final service was on Tuesday, June 13, 2017.

Episodes

References

External links

2010s American reality television series
2017 American television series debuts
American dating and relationship reality television series
English-language television shows
American television series based on British television series
NBC original programming
Television series by A Very Good Production
Television shows set in Chicago
2017 American television series endings